Seoul Station  is a South Korean adult animated zombie film written and directed by Yeon Sang-ho. It is the second released installment in, and a prequel to the Train to Busan film series. The anime explores how the zombie epidemic began in South Korea before the latter's events.

Released on August 18, 2016, the film stars Shim Eun-kyung, Ryu Seung-ryong and Lee Joon in the lead roles. The film was shown at the 2016 Brussels International Fantastic Film Festival. The film was awarded the Best Animated Feature Film at the 10th edition of the Asian Pacific Screen Awards in 2016.

Taking place in and around Seoul Station, a young runaway woman must try to survive in a world that sees her as disposable. The story revolves around three main characters: Suk-gyu, a father who searches for his runaway daughter (Hye-sun), who he finds is alive and currently a prostitute. He finds her through her boyfriend, Ki-woong, who tried to pimp her to him. Just as he is about to be reunited with her, a zombie epidemic breaks out in Seoul.

Plot
A homeless man walks around the Seoul Station area with a bloody wound on his neck until he reaches Seoul Station and lays down. A fellow squatter sits next to him, notices the blood and tries to get help, but the injured man is no longer alive when he returns. The other homeless goes to the police to report his fellow's death; the officers follow him, but the man is gone. The squatter goes to search for the old man and finds him as a zombie, who attacks him.

Hye-sun, who ran away from her former life in a brothel, now lives with her boyfriend, Ki-woong, who intends to pimp Hye-sun out again due to money problems. After a fight about this, the two separate and are caught in the chaos bursting out of Seoul Station. Hye-sun escapes with a few survivors into a police station, where they are trapped by a group of zombies within a jail cell, along with a policeman bitten by a zombie. Meanwhile, Hye-sun's father, Suk-gyu, interrogates Ki-woong for his daughter's location. The two go to Hye-sun's home, only to find that the landlady has become a zombie. Sun-gyu and Ki-woong both hide in the bathroom after another zombie attacks them, escape through the bathroom window and climb to the roof. Sun-gyu devises a plan with Ki-woong to get the zombies' attention, while he goes down to get the car. They drive away in shock, but focus on finding Hye-sun.

At the police station, the bitten officer calls for backup before succumbing to his infection, reanimating and biting another survivor in the cell. Help arrives and draws the infected away, allowing Hye-sun and an old man to escape the cell and get into an ambulance. The ambulance crew seems oblivious to what is happening to the infected. Hye-sun calls Ki-woong that she is heading to the hospital and to meet her there. The old man panics when he realizes they are en route to the hospital, where many reports of bite wounds appear to be coming in. He attempts to take the wheel from the driver and causes the vehicle to crash. Hye-sun and the old man flee through the subway tunnels. Meanwhile, Suk-gyu and Ki-woong make their way to the hospital, but discover that the zombies have already taken over the place. They barely escape before continuing their search.

Outside Hoehyeon Station, Ki-woong calls Hye-sun, but their conversation alerts the nearby infected. A group of people call them to a makeshift barricade while fighting off the infected. The two are saved, only to realize they were placed in a quarantine by riot police, who mistakenly believe the crisis to be an insurrection. Suk-gyu and Ki-woong try to persuade the police to let them through, but are rejected, as martial law has been declared without reason. The survivors slowly succumb to growing numbers of infected people. After a speech on his poor position in society, the old man attempts to climb over the police blockade to warn the government officials about the zombies, but is killed by gunfire from the summoned military. The infected charge in and overrun the barricade; Hye-Sun is able to escape, but is scratched on her foot by a zombie.

Hye-sun makes her way into an empty model apartment and notifies Ki-woong of her location. When Ki-woong and Hye-sun are reunited, she reveals that Suk-gyu is not her father but rather her previous pimp. Suk-gyu has been searching for her because she has stolen back her late natural parents' money he was keeping for himself. This outrages Ki-woong, who thought a deal was made to help him reunite with his girlfriend, yet Suk-gyu becomes violent to the point where he explains that he wants revenge on Hye-sun for theft. Ki-woong tries to subdue Suk-gyu with a knife, but Suk-gyu takes the knife from him and kills him. Hye-sun tries to flee, and Suk-gyu subdues her, but as he prepares to rape her, she dies. Suk-gyu frantically applies CPR, but then he spots the scratch on Hye-sun's foot and realizes that she is infected. As Hye-sun reanimates and kills Suk-gyu, the camera zooms past a dead Ki-woong and the infected overrunning the quarantine.

Cast
 Shim Eun-kyung as Hye-sun
 Ryu Seung-ryong as Suk-gyu
 Lee Joon as Ki-woong

Release
 Clarence Tsui of The Hollywood Reporter called the film "a simple, thrilling ride through a fiend-infested world." James Marsh of South China Morning Post gave a rating of 3/5. He commented that the film addresses South Korea's societal issues including prostitution and homelessness. Gwilym Mumford of The Guardian also gave the film a 3/5 rating. He stated that this film is different from Train to Busan because it focuses on the "desperate souls trapped in life's margins." According to Box Office Mojo, the film has a cumulative gross of $2,021,735 worldwide.

Home media 
The film first debuted on April 5, 2016 at the Brussels International Fantastic Film Festival. Created by Yeon San-ho, this animated film is considered as the prequel to his critically acclaimed movie, Train to Busan. American distributor Filmrise released the DVD and Blu-ray versions of Seoul Station on July 25, 2017. The animated film is also available to stream on Amazon Prime Video, Tubi, Apple TV and Shudder.

References

External links
 
 
 

2010s thriller films
2016 animated films
Adult animated films
Animated thriller films
Films directed by Yeon Sang-ho
Films set in Seoul
2010s Korean-language films
South Korean animated films
South Korean zombie films
Films about viral outbreaks
Prequel films
Animated films set in South Korea
South Korean prequel films
2010s South Korean films